Narender Singh Kodan (28 May 1969 – 5 February 2016) was an Indian judoka who competed at two Olympic Games.

Biography
Singh, who was born in Delhi, won his first national championship in 1985. He represented his country for the first time at the 1989 South Asian Games and won a gold medal. In the 1990 Commonwealth Games in Auckland he was the joint bronze medallist in the Extra Lightweight division. He is the first judoka to have represented India twice at the Summer Olympic Games. At his first appearance in Barcelona in 1992 he was eliminated in the first round of competition, by Egypt's Ahmed El Sayed. In 1996 he was one of four men who had to play a qualifying match in order to reduce the field to the required 32 judoka, which he won over Ireland's Sean Sullivan. He then lost in the round of 32, held at the Georgia World Congress Center in Atlanta, to Natik Bagirov from Belarus.

In 1999, he was the only Indian judoka to be featured in the Arjuna Awards.

He was a member of the Punjab Police but Singh was suspended from his duties in 2013 on suspicion of attempted murder. The incident occurred when Singh got into an altercation with a youth over parking and discharged his firearm.

He committed suicide at his residence on 5 February 2016. His wife, former Indian Olympian Sunith Thakur, found him hanging by a wire from his ceiling fan. Since being suspended by the Punjab Police he had been reportedly suffering from depression. His friend, Punjab MLA Pargat Singh was quoted as saying "It is the failure of the department that cost the life of an acclaimed sportsperson. Despite being on suspension for over two years, no senior officer considered his plea for reinstatement. When Narinder failed in his attempts, he opted to end his life. It is shameful".

References

External links
Narender Singh at Sports Reference

1969 births
2016 suicides
Indian male judoka
Olympic judoka of India
Judoka at the 1992 Summer Olympics
Judoka at the 1996 Summer Olympics
Commonwealth Games bronze medallists for India
Commonwealth Games medallists in judo
Judoka at the 1990 Commonwealth Games
Martial artists from Delhi
Indian police officers
Suicides by hanging in India
South Asian Games gold medalists for India
South Asian Games medalists in judo
People convicted of attempted murder
Recipients of the Arjuna Award
Judoka at the 1994 Asian Games
Asian Games competitors for India
20th-century Indian people
Medallists at the 1990 Commonwealth Games